Rita Wright may refer to:

 Rita Wright (museum director), American art historian
 Rita P. Wright, American anthropologist
 Syreeta Wright, (1946–2004), American singer-songwriter